Chehraa is a 1999 Indian Hindi television thriller film directed by Gautam Adhikari and produced by Markand Adhikari. It was a telefilm premiered in DD National.

Cast
Ayub Khan...Avinash Saxena 
Madhoo...Simran
Varsha Usgaonkar...Menka 
 Seema Kapoor...Jyoti

Production
The film's budget was 1 crore and was completed within 30 days.

Music

References

External links

1990s Hindi-language films
1999 films
Indian television films
Indian thriller films